1810 Epimetheus , provisional designation , is a stony Florian asteroid from the inner regions of the asteroid belt, approximately 8 kilometers in diameter.

It was discovered on 24 September 1960, by Dutch astronomer couple Ingrid and Cornelis van Houten, and Dutch–American astronomer Tom Gehrels during the Palomar–Leiden survey at Palomar Observatory in California, United States. It was later named after Epimetheus from Greek mythology.

Classification and orbit 

The S-type asteroid is a member of the Flora family, one of the largest groups of stony asteroids in the main-belt. It orbits the Sun at a distance of 2.0–2.4 AU once every 3 years and 4 months (1,211 days). Its orbit has an eccentricity of 0.09 and an inclination of 4° with respect to the ecliptic.

Physical characteristics

Rotation period 

Two divergent rotational lightcurves of Epimetheus were obtained from photometric observations. They gave a rotation period of 10.9 and 28.6 hours with both having a brightness variation of 0.04 magnitude.

Diameter and albedo 

According to the survey carried out by NASA's Wide-field Infrared Survey Explorer with its subsequent NEOWISE mission, Epimetheus measures 7.7 kilometers in diameter and its surface has an albedo of 0.27, while the Collaborative Asteroid Lightcurve Link assumes an albedo of 0.24 – derived from 8 Flora, the largest member and namesake of its orbital family – and calculates a diameter of 8.2 kilometers, based on an absolute magnitude of 12.6.

Survey designation 

The survey designation "P-L" stands for Palomar–Leiden, named after Palomar Observatory and Leiden Observatory, which collaborated on the fruitful Palomar–Leiden survey in the 1960s. Gehrels used Palomar's Samuel Oschin telescope (also known as the 48-inch Schmidt Telescope), and shipped the photographic plates to Ingrid and Cornelis van Houten at Leiden Observatory where astrometry was carried out. The trio are credited with the discovery of several thousand minor planets.

Naming 

This minor planet is named for the Titan in Greek mythology, Epimetheus, who opened Pandora's box, which contained all the illnesses and ailments of mankind (also see 55 Pandora). Epimetheus is also a moon of Saturn, which was discovered by Voyager 1 in 1980. Epimetheus is the brother of Prometheus after whom the minor planet 1809 Prometheus was named. The official  was published by the Minor Planet Center on 20 February 1976.

Notes

References

External links 
 Asteroid Lightcurve Database (LCDB), query form (info )
 Dictionary of Minor Planet Names, Google books
 Asteroids and comets rotation curves, CdR – Observatoire de Genève, Raoul Behrend
 Discovery Circumstances: Numbered Minor Planets (1)-(5000) – Minor Planet Center
 
 

001810
Discoveries by Cornelis Johannes van Houten
Discoveries by Ingrid van Houten-Groeneveld
Discoveries by Tom Gehrels
4196
Named minor planets
001810
19600924